Margie Reiger was a silent movie actress.

Reiger was the leading lady in Charlie Chaplin's 1915 film By the Sea. This one-reel short film was filmed in one day in the vicinity of the pier in Venice, California.

The BBFC turned down A Woman when it was submitted in March 1915, although they later relented and the film was shown in the UK in July 1916. This was either for Chaplin's transvestitism, appearing disguised as a woman, or for Charles Inslee's pursuit of Reiger in a park, the "premeditated seduction of a girl".

She acted opposite Bernard "Ben" Turpin in The Wrong Coat, also in 1915.

Filmography
Fun at a Ballgame
Countless Count
By the Sea (1915)
A Woman (1915)
The Wrong Coat

References

External links
 

American silent film actresses
20th-century American actresses
Year of birth missing
Year of death missing
Place of birth missing
Place of death missing
Nationality missing
Articles containing video clips